is an American-Japanese professional basketball player.

Biography
Raised in Bakersfield, California, Sakuragi played college basketball at the University of California, Los Angeles (UCLA), and was a member of the Bruins' national championship team in 1994–95. He was able to play all five positions. On the NCAA championship team in his freshman year, Sakuragi was named the team's most valuable freshman along with Toby Bailey. He was named to the All-Pac-10 first team during his sophomore and senior seasons, and was also named the Bruins' co-most valuable player both years as well. He averaged 14.2 points per game in his four-year career at the school.  He was selected by the Vancouver Grizzlies in the 2nd round (56th pick) of the 1998 NBA Draft where he played one season.

Sakuragi played the next two years for teams in Las Vegas and France and summer-league teams in Puerto Rico and the Philippines. In 2001, he moved to Japan to play for the Aisin Seahorses of the JBL Super League, averaging 21.5 points and 11.6 rebounds per game in 2006.

Sakuragi's application to become a naturalized Japanese citizen cleared on July 2, 2007, and he changed his name from J. R. Henderson to J. R. Sakuragi. He chose his new name for two reasons: firstly, he thought a Japanese name would speed up the naturalization, and secondly for the Japanese sakura cherry blossoms. It also corresponded to the name of Hanamichi Sakuragi, the protagonist of the popular basketball manga Slam Dunk.

Sakuragi played for the Japan national team as they competed in the 2007 FIBA Asia Championship, a qualifier for the 2008 Summer Olympics.

To comply with Japanese naturalization requirements, Sakuragi taught himself to read, speak and write Japanese at a "rudimentary level". He intended to stay in Japan without intention of returning to live in the U.S.

References

External links

J. R. Sakuragi Basketball Player Profile, stats, biography, career at Asia-Basket.com

"SeaHorses veteran J.R. Sakuragi announces retirement"

1976 births
Living people
American expatriate basketball people in Canada
American expatriate basketball people in France
American expatriate basketball people in Japan
American expatriate basketball people in Venezuela
American men's basketball players
Basketball players from Bakersfield, California
Caciques de Humacao players
Japanese men's basketball players
Japanese people of African-American descent
Las Vegas Silver Bandits players
Marinos B.B.C. players
Naturalized citizens of Japan
Paris Racing Basket players
Power forwards (basketball)
SeaHorses Mikawa players
UCLA Bruins men's basketball players
Vancouver Grizzlies draft picks
Vancouver Grizzlies players
American expatriate basketball people in the Philippines
Philippine Basketball Association imports
TNT Tropang Giga players